Nudibranchs are a group of soft-bodied marine gastropod molluscs that shed their shells after their larval stage. They are noted for their often extraordinary colours and striking forms, and they have been given colourful nicknames to match, such as "clown", "marigold", "splendid", "dancer", "dragon", and "sea rabbit". Currently, about 3,000 valid species of nudibranchs are known.

The word "nudibranch" comes from the Latin  "naked" and the Ancient Greek  "gills".

Nudibranchs are often casually called sea slugs, as they are a family of opistobranchs (sea slugs), within the phylum Mollusca (molluscs), but many sea slugs belong to several taxonomic groups that are not closely related to nudibranchs. A number of these other sea slugs, such as the photosynthetic Sacoglossa and the colourful Aglajidae, are often confused with nudibranchs.

Distribution and habitat

Nudibranchs occur in seas worldwide, ranging from the Arctic, through temperate and tropical regions, to the Southern Ocean around Antarctica. They are almost entirely restricted to salt water, although a few species are known to inhabit lower salinities in brackish water.

The greatest diversity of nudibranchs is seen in warm, shallow reefs, although one nudibranch species was discovered at a depth near .

Nudibranchs are benthic animals, found crawling over the substrate. The only exceptions to this are the neustonic Glaucus nudibranchs, which float upside down just under the ocean's surface; the pelagic nudibranchs Cephalopyge trematoides, which swim in the water column; and Phylliroe bucephalum.

Anatomical description

The body forms of nudibranchs vary a great deal, but because they are opisthobranchs, unlike most other gastropods, they are apparently bilaterally symmetrical externally (but not internally) because they have undergone secondary detorsion. In all nudibranchs, the male and female sexual openings are on the right side of the body, reflecting their asymmetrical origins. They lack a mantle cavity. Some species have venomous appendages (cerata) on their sides, which deter predators. Many also have a simple gut and a mouth with a radula.

The eyes in nudibranchs are simple and able to discern little more than light and dark. The eyes are set into the body, are about a quarter of a millimeter in diameter, and consist of a lens and five photoreceptors.

The adult form is without a shell or operculum (in shelled gastropods, the operculum is a bony or horny plate that can cover the opening of the shell when the body is withdrawn). In most species, there is a swimming veliger larva with a coiled shell, but the shell is shed at metamorphosis when the larva transforms into the adult form. Some species have direct development, and the shell is shed before the animal emerges from the egg mass.

The name nudibranch is appropriate, since the dorids (infraclass Anthobranchia) breathe through a "naked gill" shaped into branchial plumes in a rosette on their backs. By contrast, on the back of the aeolids in the clade Cladobranchia, brightly coloured sets of protruding organs called cerata are present.

Nudibranchs have cephalic (head) tentacles, which are sensitive to touch, taste, and smell. Club-shaped rhinophores detect odors.

Defence mechanisms

In the course of their evolution, nudibranchs have lost their shells, while developing alternative defence mechanisms. Some species evolved an external anatomy with textures and colours that mimicked surrounding sessile invertebrate animals (often their prey sponges or soft corals) to avoid predators (camouflage). Other nudibranchs, as seen especially well on Chromodoris quadricolor, have an intensely bright and contrasting colour pattern that makes them especially conspicuous in their surroundings. Nudibranch molluscs are the most commonly cited examples of aposematism in marine ecosystems, but the evidence for this has been contested, mostly because few examples of mimicry are seen among species, many species are nocturnal or cryptic, and bright colours at the red end of the spectrum are rapidly attenuated as a function of water depth. For example, the Spanish dancer nudibranch (genus Hexabranchus), among the largest of tropical marine slugs, potently chemically defended, and brilliantly red and white, is nocturnal and has no known mimics. Other studies of nudibranch molluscs have concluded they are aposematically coloured, for example, the slugs of the family Phylidiidae from Indo-Pacific coral reefs.

Nudibranchs that feed on hydrozoids can store the hydrozoids' nematocysts (stinging cells) in the dorsal body wall, the cerata. These stolen nematocysts, called kleptocnidae, wander through the alimentary tract without harming the nudibranch. Once further into the organ, the cells are assimilated by intestinal protuberances and brought to specific placements on the creature's hind body. Nudibranchs can protect themselves from the hydrozoids and their nematocysts; the specific mechanism is yet unknown, but special cells with large vacuoles probably play an important role. Similarly, some nudibranchs can also take in plant cells (symbiotic algae from soft corals) and reuse these to make food for themselves. The related group of sacoglossan sea slugs feed on algae and retain just the chloroplasts for their own photosynthetic use, a process known as kleptoplasty.

Nudibranchs use a variety of chemical defences to aid in protection, but it is not necessary for the strategy to be lethal to be effective; in fact, good arguments exist that chemical defences should evolve to be distasteful rather than toxic. Some sponge-eating nudibranchs concentrate the chemical defences from their prey sponge in their bodies, rendering themselves distasteful to predators. One method of chemical defense used by nudibranchs are secondary metabolites, which play an important role in mediating relationships among marine communities. The evidence that suggests the chemical compounds used by dorid nudibranchs do in fact come from dietary sponges lies in the similarities between the metabolites of prey and nudibranchs, respectively. Furthermore, nudibranchs contain a mixture of sponge chemicals when they are in the presence of multiple food sources, as well as change defence chemicals with a concurrent change in diet. This, however, is not the only way for nudibranchs to develop chemical defences. Certain Antarctic marine species defense mechanisms are believed to be controlled by biological factors like predation and competition, and selective pressures. Certain species are able to produce their own chemicals de novo without dietary influence. Evidence for the different methods of chemical production comes with the characteristic uniformity of chemical composition across drastically different environments and geographic locations found throughout de novo production species compared to the wide variety of dietary and environmentally dependent chemical composition in sequestering species.

Another method of protection is the release of the ugdon acid from the skin. Once the specimen is physically irritated or touched by another creature, it will release the mucus automatically, eating the animal from the inside out.

Apparent production of sound
In 1884, Philip Henry Gosse reported observations by "Professor Grant" (possibly Robert Edmond Grant) that two species of nudibranchs emit sounds that are audible to humans.

Two very elegant species of Sea-slug, viz., Eolis punctata [i.e. Facelina annulicornis], and Tritonia arborescens [i.e. Dendronotus frondosus], certainly produce audible sounds. Professor Grant, who first observed the interesting fact in some specimens of the latter which he was keeping in an aquarium, says of the sounds, that 'they resemble very much the clink of a steel wire on the side of the jar, one stroke only been given at a time, and repeated at intervals of a minute or two; when placed in a large basin of water the sound is much obscured, and is like that of a watch, one stroke being repeated, as before, at intervals. The sound is longest and most often repeated when the Tritonia are lively and moving about, and is not heard when they are cold and without any motion; in the dark I have not observed any light emitted at the time of the stroke; no globule of air escapes to the surface of the water, nor is any ripple produced on the surface at the instant of the stroke; the sound, when in a glass vessel, is mellow and distinct.' The Professor has kept these Tritonia alive in his room for a month, and during the whole period of their confinement they have continued to produce the sounds with very little diminution of their original intensity. In a small apartment they are audible at the distance of twelve feet. The sounds obviously proceed from the mouth of the animal; and at the instant of the stroke, we observe the lips suddenly separate, as if to allow the water to rush into a small vacuum formed within. As these animals are hermaphrodites, requiring mutual impregnation, the sounds may possibly be a means of communication between them, or, if they are of an electric nature, they may be the means of defending from foreign enemies one of the most delicate, defenceless, and beautiful Gasteropods that inhabit the deep.

Lifecycle

Nudibranchs are hermaphroditic, thus having a set of reproductive organs for both sexes, but they cannot fertilize themselves. Mating usually takes a few minutes, and involves a dance-like courtship. Nudibranchs typically deposit their eggs within a gelatinous spiral, which is often described as looking like a ribbon. The number of eggs varies; it can be as few as just 1 or 2 eggs (Vayssierea felis) or as many as an estimated 25 million (Aplysia fasciata{not a nudibranch}). The eggs contain toxins from sea sponges as a means of deterring predators. After hatching, the infants look almost identical to their adult counterparts, albeit smaller. Infants may also have fewer cerata. The lifespan of nudibranchs can range from a few weeks to a year, depending on the species.

Feeding and ecological role

All known nudibranchs are carnivorous. Some feed on sponges, others on hydroids (e.g. Cuthona), others on bryozoans (phanerobranchs such as Tambja, Limacia, Plocamopherus and Triopha), and some eat other sea slugs or their eggs (e.g. Favorinus) or, on some occasions, are cannibals and prey on members of their own species. Other groups feed on tunicates (e.g. Nembrotha, Goniodoris), other nudibranchs (Roboastra, which are descended from tunicate-feeding species), barnacles (e.g. Onchidoris bilamellata), and anemones (e.g. the Aeolidiidae and other Cladobranchia).

The surface-dwelling nudibranch, Glaucus atlanticus, is a specialist predator of siphonophores, such as the Portuguese man o' war. This predatory mollusc sucks air into its stomach to keep it afloat, and using its muscular foot, it clings to the surface film. If it finds a small victim, Glaucus simply envelops it with its capacious mouth, but if the prey is a larger siphonophore, the mollusc nibbles off its fishing tentacles, the ones carrying the most potent nematocysts. Like some others of its kind, Glaucus does not digest the nematocysts; instead, it uses them to defend itself by passing them from its gut to the surface of its skin.

Taxonomy

Nudibranchs are commonly divided into two main kinds, dorid and aeolid (also spelled eolid) nudibranchs:
Dorids (clade Anthobranchia, Doridacea, or Doridoidea) are recognised by having an intact digestive gland and the feather-like branchial (gill) plume, which forms a cluster on the posterior part of the body, around the anus. Fringes on the mantle do not contain any intestines. Additionally, dorid nudibranchs commonly have distinct pockets, bumps, and/or mantle dermal formations, which are distortions on their skin, used to store bioactive defense chemicals.
Aeolids (clade Cladobranchia) have cerata (spread across the back) instead of the branchial plume. The cerata function in place of gills and facilitate gas exchange through the epidermis. Additionally, aeolids possess a branched digestive gland, which may extend into the cerate and often has tips that contain cnidosacs (stinging cells absorbed from prey species and then used by the nudibranch). They lack a mantle. Some are hosts to zooxanthellae.

The exact systematics of nudibranchs are a topic of recent revision. Traditionally, nudibranchs have been treated as the order Nudibranchia, located in the gastropod mollusc subclass Opisthobranchia (the marine slugs: which consisted of nudibranchs, sidegill slugs, bubble snails, algae sap-sucking sea slugs, and sea hares). Since 2005, pleurobranchs (which had previously been grouped among sidegill slugs) have been placed alongside nudibranchs in the clade Nudipleura (recognising them as more closely related to each other than to other opisthobranchs). Since 2010, Opisthobranchia has been recognised as not a valid clade (it is paraphyletic) and instead Nudipleura has been placed as the first offshoot of Euthyneura (which is the dominant clade of gastropods).

Traditional hierarchy
This classification was based on the work of Johannes Thiele (1931), who built on the concepts of Henri Milne-Edwards (1848).

Order Nudibranchia:
 Infraorder Anthobranchia Férussac, 1819 (dorids)
 Superfamily Doridoidea Rafinesque, 1815
 Superfamily Doridoxoidea Bergh, 1900
 Superfamily Onchidoridoidea Alder & Hancock, 1845
 Superfamily Polyceroidea Alder & Hancock, 1845
 Infraorder Cladobranchia Willan & Morton, 1984 (aeolids)
 Superfamily Aeolidioidea J. E. Gray, 1827
 Superfamily Arminoidea Rafinesque, 1814
 Superfamily Dendronotoidea Allman, 1845
 Superfamily Metarminoidea Odhner in Franc, 1968

Early revisions
Newer insights derived from morphological data and gene-sequence research seemed to confirm those ideas. On the basis of investigation of 18S rDNA sequence data, strong evidence supports the monophyly of the Nudibranchia and its two major groups, the Anthobranchia/Doridoidea and Cladobranchia. A study published in May 2001, again revised the taxonomy of the Nudibranchia. They were thus divided into two major clades:
 Anthobranchia (= Bathydoridoidea + Doridoidea)
 Dexiarchia nom. nov. (= Doridoxoidea + Dendronotoidea + Aeolidoidea + "Arminoidea").

However, according to the taxonomy by Bouchet & Rocroi (2005), currently the most up-to-date system of classifying the gastropods, the Nudibranchia are a subclade within the clade of the Nudipleura. The Nudibranchia are then divided into two clades:
Euctenidiacea (= Holohepatica)
Gnathodoridacea (contains only Bathydorididae)
Doridacea
Doridoidea
Phyllidioidea
Onchidoridoidea
Polyceroidea (= Phanerobranchiata Non Suctoria)
Dexiarchia (= Actenidiacea)
Pseudoeuctenidiacea ( = Doridoxida)
Cladobranchia ( = Cladohepatica)
Euarminida
Dendronotida
Aeolidida
Unassigned Cladobranchia (previously Metarminoidea)
 Charcotiidae
 Dironidae
 Goniaeolididae
 Heroidae
 Proctonotidae
 Madrellidae
 Pinufiidae
 Embletoniidae

Gallery
This gallery shows some of the great variability in the color and form of nudibranchs, and nudibranch egg ribbons.

See also
 Symposia and workshops on opisthobranchs

References

Further reading 
 Thompson, T. E. (1976). Biology of opisthobranch molluscs Vol. 1. 207 pp., 21 pls. Ray Society, no. 151.
 Thompson, T. E., & G. H. Brown (1984). Biology of opisthobranch molluscs Vol. 2. 229 pp., 41 pls. Ray Society, no. 156.
 McDonald, Gary R. (7 July 2021). Institute of Marine Sciences. Bibliographia Nudibranchia, 3rd online Edition. A listing, by Author, of publications on nudibranchs.
 McDonald, Gary R. (7 July 2021). Institute of Marine Sciences. Nudibranch Systematic Index, 3rd online Edition. An index of names given to nudibranchs and their subsequent use, referenced to Bibliographia Nudibranchia.
 McDonald, Gary R. & J. W. Nybakken. (November 5, 2014). List of the Worldwide Food Habits of Nudibranchs
 Coleman, Neville (2008). Nudibranchs Encyclopedia: Catalogue of Asia/Indo-Pacific Sea Slugs. Neville Coleman's Underwater Geographic.

External links

 Sea Slug Forum by William B. Rudman
 Nudibranchs of the British Isles
 OPK Opistobranquis – Iberian and Mediterranean Opisthobranchs
 Mediterranean slug site (actually a misnomer – Worldwide coverage
 The Slug Site, Michael D. Miller 2002–2014
 The Okinawa Slug Site
 Images, information and identification of Nudibranchs
 Nudibranch Photos by Mick Tait
 Nudibranchs in their natural environment, Scuba Diving – Narooma NSW offline? 26 Nov 2014
 Nudi Pixel: Online resource for nudibranchs and sea slugs identification using photographs 
 Various nudibranch species from Indonesia, Philippines and Thailand
 Nudibranch gallery- Sergey Parinov – offline? 26 Nov 2014
 Opisthobranch Newsletter – Bibliography and portal to opisthobranch, nudibranch & seaslug information
 Scottish Nudibranchs: Online resource for identification of species found in Scottish waters
 National Geographic Nudibranch Photo Gallery
 Sea Slugs of Hawaii
 Slug City – Molluscs. Brain & Behavior, from the University of Illinois at Urbana-Champaign

Videos
 Attack of the Sea Slugs at YouTube
 The Lynx Nudibranch: HD clip of Phidiana lynceus carefully consuming a hydroid Myrionema amboinense.
 Slug City – Molluscs. Brain & Behavior: many videos of nudibranchs from the University of Illinois at Urbana-Champaign

Nudipleura
 
Taxa named by Georges Cuvier